Sanober Kabir is a former Bollywood actress. She was born to Sabiha and NS Kabir. She is the niece of actor Raza Murad and granddaughter of veteran actor Murad. Her cousin is actress Sonam.  She made her debut in Sawan Kumar Tak’s movie ‘Mother 98’, starring Rekha. After acting in few Bollywood flicks, Sanober decided to shift focus with her career and concentrated on television. After doing some TV Serials like Tum Bin Jaoon Kahaan, Arzoo Hai Tu and Karishma, she turned to singing and launched her remix album "Bombshell Babe". The tune from that album Meri Beri Ke Ber Mat Todo was a huge hit. In 2010, Sanober married actor Rajeev Singh who is the winner of 2001 Manhunt International.

Music and Music Videos

References

External links

http://www.gr8mag.com/posts.php?id=253

Indian film actresses
Living people
Year of birth missing (living people)